Irismetov is a surname. Notable people with the surname include:

 Farkhadbek Irismetov (born 1981), Kazakhstani footballer
 Jafar Irismetov (born 1976), Uzbekistani footballer and coach